The Viking Cup was a world ice hockey tournament in Camrose, Alberta. The prestigious Viking Cup international hockey tournament operated out of Camrose, with the Augustana Vikings as its host, between 1980 and 2006. 

The Viking Cup regularly featured national U-18 and other teams from Sweden, Finland, the United States, Slovakia, the Czech Republic and Russia, with other European nations also making appearances.

Each of these countries brought with them different and unique styles of play, with the Cup serving as a venue for these different systems to be pitted against each other to their mutual benefit.

Junior and collegiate teams from the United States and Canada also participated in the Viking Cup. Each tournament served as an opportunity for scouts from the professional ranks, including the NHL, to lay eyes on some of the top young hockey talent from around the world. Over 400 tournament alumni had their names called during NHL drafts.

Eventual NHL stars Dominik Hasek, Joe Pavelski, Paul Stastny, Olli Jokinen, Andrei Markov, Sergei Zubov, Miikka Kiprusoff, Tomas Vokoun, James Patrick, Zigmund Palffy, Patrik Elias, Mikko Koivu, Sergei Gonchar, Henrik Lundqvist, Henrik Zetterberg, and Tuuka Rask rank among the Cup’s most decorated alumni.

The Viking Cup built upon Camrose’s existing decorated history of hosting hockey trailblazers. The 1974–75 Camrose Lutheran College Vikings shocked the hockey world when they emerged from a tiny rural school to win the first-ever Canadian collegiate ice hockey championship.

Problems developed in the late 1990s as the Canadian Jr. A teams, which were popular with fans, were allowed to play with some 20-year-old players.  This upset the European teams (which were all Under-18) and led to unbalanced games with the North American teams dominating their younger European opponents.

TOURNAMENT MVPs:
1981 - Hannu Virta (TPS)
1982 - Petr Klíma (CSSR)
1983-(Brian Hermanutz) (NAIT)
1984 - Cleo Rowein (NAIT)
1986 - Mark Schultz (NAIT)
1988 - Brent Severyn (U of A)
1990 - Jamie Reeve (McGill)
1992 - Sergei Brylin (CIS)
1994 - Sergei Luchinkin (Russia)
1996 - Olli Jokinen (Finland)
1998 - Mark Hartigan (SJHL)
2000 - Rick Gorman (USA)
2002 - Jeff Tambellini (BCHL)
2004 - Tuukka Rask (Finland)*
2006 (University Pool) - Patrick Ouelette (AUC)

TOP GOALTENDER:
1981 - Jouni Rokama (TPS)
1982 - Dominik Hašek (CSSR)
1984 - Ivo Capek (CSSR)
1986 - Radek Toth (CSSR)
1988 - Roman Turek (CSSR)
1990 - Jiří Podešva (CSSR)
1992 - Chris Somers (UNB)
1994 - Anton Zelenov (Russia)
1996 - Jani Riihinen (Finland)
1998 - Rob Schrader (SJHL)
2000 - Henrik Lundqvist (Sweden)
2002 - Chad Rycroft (AUC)
2004 - Tuukka Rask (Finland)*
2006 (University Pool) - Ken Ritson (Guelph)
2006 (Junior Pool) - Kyle Richter (AJHL South)

 - the first player to win both MVP and Top Goaltender Awards

Ice hockey tournaments in Canada
Sport in Camrose, Alberta